Bakr Bassam (born 22 December 1939) is an Egyptian weightlifter. He competed in the men's middle heavyweight event at the 1968 Summer Olympics.

References

External links
 

1939 births
Living people
Egyptian male weightlifters
Olympic weightlifters of Egypt
Weightlifters at the 1968 Summer Olympics
Sportspeople from Cairo
20th-century Egyptian people